Värmlandstrafik AB is the public transport authority for Värmland, Sweden.

References

External links
 Official site

Companies based in Värmland County
Railway companies of Sweden
Public transport authorities of Sweden